St Michael and all Angels' Church, Alsop en le Dale is a Grade II listed parish church in the Church of England in Alsop en le Dale, Derbyshire.

History

The church dates from the 12th century and was rebuilt between 1882 and 1883 by Frederick Josias Robinson. The flat roof was removed and replaced with a pitched roof. The plaster on the walls was removed. The floors were re-laid, that in the chancel with Minton encaustic tiles, and the rest with wooden blocks. A new stone font replaced the old one. The pulpit which had formerly been in St Oswald's Church, Ashbourne was installed. The contractor was J Knowles of Brassington.

Parish status

The church is in a joint parish with
St Edmund’s Church, Fenny Bentley
St Peter's Church, Parwich
St Leonard’s Church, Thorpe
St Mary's Church, Tissington

See also
Listed buildings in Eaton and Alsop

References

Church of England church buildings in Derbyshire
Grade II listed churches in Derbyshire